Mutne  is a village in the administrative district of Gmina Jeleśnia, within Żywiec County, Silesian Voivodeship, in southern Poland.

The village has a population of 457.

References

Mutne